Waynecastle is a very small village between Waynesboro and Greencastle in Antrim Township, Franklin County, Pennsylvania.  It is home to a historic grain elevator that was used for the Western Maryland Railroad.  The area also has a small railroad trestle that runs over route 16.  The railroad tracks are still used by CSX.  Trains go by several times a day.  The Grain elevator building is home to the Waynesboro Model Railroad Club inc.

Unincorporated communities in Pennsylvania